Otto Retzer (born 1945) is an Austrian actor, producer and director.

Selected filmography
 Don't Get Angry (1972)
 100 Fäuste und ein Vaterunser (1972)
 Blue Blooms the Gentian (1973)
 No Sin on the Alpine Pastures (1974)
 The Maddest Car in the World (1975)
 Three Bavarians in Bangkok (1976)
 Sunshine Reggae in Ibiza (1983)
 Die Supernasen (1983)

Director
 Starke Zeiten (1988)
 Hochwürden erbt das Paradies (1993)
  (1993), starring Barry Newman, Ernest Borgnine
  (1993), starring George Hamilton, Morgan Fairchild
 Veterinarian Christine (1993), starring Ernest Borgnine
 Drei in fremden Kissen (1995)
 Ein Richter zum Küssen (1995)
 Veterinarian Christine II: The Temptation (1995), starring Ernest Borgnine
 The Black Curse (1995), starring James Brolin, Deborah Shelton
  (1996)
 Drei in fremden Betten (1996)
 Die Superbullen (1997)
 Fröhliche Chaoten (1998)
 Die blaue Kanone (1999)
 Hochwürden wird Papa (2002)
 Alles Glück dieser Erde (2003), starring Maximilian Schell
 Heimkehr mit Hindernissen (2012)
 Der Ruf der Pferde (2013)

References

Bibliography 
 Roman Schliesser & Leo Moser. Die Supernase: Karl Spiehs und seine Filme. Ueberreuter, 2006.

External links 
 

1945 births
Living people
Austrian male film actors
Austrian male television actors
Austrian film directors
Austrian television directors
Austrian film producers